Bathybela tenelluna is a species of sea snail, a marine gastropod mollusk in the family Raphitomidae.

Description
The shell attains a length of 55 mm.

Distribution
This marine species occurs in the Atlantic Ocean off Western Sahara, the Azores and North Carolina, USA

References

 Locard A. (1897-1898). Expéditions scientifiques du Travailleur et du Talisman pendant les années 1880, 1881, 1882 et 1883. Mollusques testacés. Paris, Masson. vol. 1 [1897, p. 1-516 pl. 1-22; vol. 2 [1898], p. 1-515, pl. 1-18]
 Gofas, S.; Le Renard, J.; Bouchet, P. (2001). Mollusca. in: Costello, M.J. et al. (eds), European Register of Marine Species: a check-list of the marine species in Europe and a bibliography of guides to their identification. Patrimoines Naturels. 50: 180-213
 Bouchet, P.; Warén, A. (1980). Revision of the North-East Atlantic bathyal and abyssal Turridae (Mollusca: Gastropoda). Journal of Molluscan Studies. Suppl. 8: 1-119
 Sysoev A.V. (2014). Deep-sea fauna of European seas: An annotated species check-list of benthic invertebrates living deeper than 2000 m in the seas bordering Europe. Gastropoda. Invertebrate Zoology. Vol.11. No.1: 134–155

External links
 Lectotype at MNHN, Paris
 

tenelluna
Gastropods described in 1897